Ivar Throndsen (March 29, 1853 –  January 18, 1932) was a Norwegian engraver.

Throndsen was born in Nes, Akershus. He became an apprentice to the goldsmith Jacob Tostrup in Christiania (now Oslo) in 1870, and at the same time studied at the Norwegian National Academy of Craft and Art Industry under the sculptor Julius Middelthun. He received a job at the Royal Norwegian Mint in Kongsberg in 1879 and, after finishing his studies, started working there in 1880. He produced nearly 500 medals, tokens, and badges during his career. Throndsen died in Kongsberg. His work was catalogued by Ragnar Støren and Hans Holst in 1937.

Selected works 
 H. M. The King's Commemorative Medal
 H. M. The King's Gold Medal
 South Pole Medal
 Norwegian Constitution Day medals, 1884–1920
 1893 Original Die for the Posthorn Stamp (Roman lettering)
 1902 Nobel Peace Prize Medal based on a model by the sculptor Gustav Vigeland

References

Norwegian engravers
People from Nes, Akershus
1853 births
1932 deaths
Medallists